Peter MacNicol (born April 10, 1954) is an American actor. He received a Theatre World Award for his 1981 Broadway debut in the play Crimes of the Heart. His film roles include Galen in Dragonslayer (1981), Stingo in Sophie's Choice (1982), Janosz Poha in Ghostbusters II (1989), camp organizer Gary Granger in Addams Family Values (1993), and David Langley in Bean (1997).

MacNicol won the Primetime Emmy Award for Outstanding Supporting Actor in a Comedy Series in 2001 for his role as the eccentric lawyer John Cage in the FOX comedy-drama Ally McBeal (1997–2002). He is also known for his television roles as attorney Alan Birch in the medical drama Chicago Hope (1994–98), X the Eliminator on Harvey Birdman: Attorney at Law (2000–2007), physicist Dr. Larry Fleinhardt on the CBS crime drama Numbers (2005–10), Tom Lennox in the sixth season of action-thriller 24 (2007), Doctor Octopus in The Spectacular Spider-Man (2008–09), Dr. Stark on Grey's Anatomy (2010–11), Jeff Kane on the political satire series Veep (2016–19), and Nigel the Advisor on Tangled: The Series (2017–20). He also voiced the Mad Hatter in the Batman: Arkham video game series.

Early life
MacNicol was born and raised in Dallas, Texas, the youngest of five children of Barbara Jean (née Gottlich), a homemaker, and John Wilbur Johnson, a Norwegian-American corporate executive who became an Episcopal priest later in life. He is a graduate of MacArthur High School in Irving, Texas.

Career
MacNicol performed at the Guthrie Theater in Minneapolis for two seasons from 1978 to 1979. He appeared in productions, which included Hamlet and The Pretenders. He made his New York debut in the 1980 off-Broadway play, Crimes of the Heart. The production then moved to Broadway in 1981, and he won the Theatre World Award. It was during this production that a casting agent noticed him and audition him for a role in the film, Sophie's Choice. In 1981 he landed the starring role in his first film, Dragonslayer, opposite Ralph Richardson.

In 1987, MacNicol starred in the Trinity Repertory Company's original production of the stage adaptation of Robert Penn Warren's All the King's Men, which first appeared at the Dallas Theater Center. The adaptation was developed in consultation with the author.

Among his other stage credits is the Broadway production of Black Comedy/White Lies. He has appeared in repertory theater, including the New York Shakespeare Festival where he played title roles in Richard II and Romeo and Juliet; and in Twelfth Night, Rum and Coke and Found a Peanut.

In film, he plays the naive Southern writer who falls in love with Meryl Streep in Sophie's Choice, the museum curator Janosz Poha in Ghostbusters II, and camp director Gary Granger alongside future Numbers co-star David Krumholtz in Addams Family Values. Other film credits include the films Housesitter and American Blue Note.

From 1992 to 1993 he starred opposite John Forsythe, Holland Taylor, David Hyde Pierce and Joseph Gordon-Levitt as press secretary Bradley Grist in the political television comedy The Powers That Be.

In 1994 MacNicol played the role of Alan Birch for the first season and part of the second season of Chicago Hope once creator David E. Kelley departed. He later rejoined Kelley in 1997 by taking a role on another TV series, Ally McBeal, as a main guest star from Season 1 to Season 4 and a recurring character in Season 5. MacNicol is well known for his Ally McBeal performance as eccentric attorney John Cage, for which he won an Emmy Award for Outstanding Supporting Actor in a Comedy Series in 2001. He also starred in the drama Numbers as physicist Dr. Larry Fleinhardt, and had a role as Tom Lennox in the sixth season of the hit FOX show 24. MacNicol reprised his role as Lennox in the film 24: Redemption. He also played Mario, a hotel receptionist, in the Cheers episode, "Look Before You Sleep".

MacNicol has lent his voice to several comic book supervillains: Dr. Kirk Langstrom / Man-Bat in The Batman, David Clinton / Chronos in Justice League Unlimited, Professor Ivo in Young Justice, Dr. Otto Octavius / Doctor Octopus in The Spectacular Spider-Man, X The Eliminator in Harvey Birdman, Attorney at Law and the Mad Hatter in the video games Batman: Arkham City, Batman: Arkham Origins, and Batman: Arkham Knight. He also voiced Firefly in G.I. Joe: Renegades.

MacNicol played Dr. Stark, a pediatric surgeon, on Grey's Anatomy.

MacNicol was nominated for an Emmy for outstanding guest actor in the fifth season of Veep; however, this was rescinded because he appeared in "too many of the show’s episodes; the rules require that a guest actor nominee be in less than half of a season." He qualified when his entry was submitted, but then he appeared very briefly in one more episode. He was later nominated in the same category for the seventh season of Veep.

Personal life
MacNicol has been married to Martha Cumming since 1986.

Filmography

Film

Television

Video games

References

External links

 

1954 births
Living people
American male film actors
American male television actors
American male voice actors
American people of Irish descent
American people of Jewish descent
American people of Norwegian descent
Male actors from Dallas
Male actors from Texas
Outstanding Performance by a Supporting Actor in a Comedy Series Primetime Emmy Award winners
20th-century American male actors
21st-century American male actors